The WNBL Sixth Woman of the Year Award is an annual Women's National Basketball League (WNBL) award given since the 2019–20 WNBL season to the most outstanding player coming off the bench.

Winners

See also 
 WNBL All-Star Team
 WNBL Most Valuable Player Award
 Australia women's national basketball team

References 

Defensive